The Uppland Runic Inscription 158  is a lost Viking Age runestone engraved in Old Norse with the Younger Futhark runic alphabet. It was located in Löttinge, in Täby Municipality.

Inscription
Transliteration of the runes into Latin characters

 [kalukʀ lit × risa × stn × þina × iftʀ × siba · boanta sin × koes...--... faþur · s¶in han fal · s... ¶ keþfrekr]

Old Norse transcription:

 

English translation:

 "<kalukʀ> had this stone raised in memory of Sibbi, her husbandman ... her father. He fell south(?) ... "

References

Runestones in Uppland
Runestones in memory of Viking warriors